John Pownall (born June 6, 1992), known professionally as Johniepee, is an Australian rapper, songwriter, and record producer.

Career 
While working as a personal trainer in Sydney, Australia, Johniepee formed a friendship with client Bliss (Jonathan Notley) of the Australian hip-hop recording group Bliss n Eso. With experience only performing live shows to intimate crowds, Bliss invited Johniepee to be an opening act for Bliss n Eso's February/March 2017 The Dopamine Tour. Johniepee went on to release his debut EP, Bigger Things.

His single October 2017 single "Stay" gained notoriety after Tigerair began playing the song on inflight programming for all domestic flights in 2019.

He released his debut album, Attachment Theory, in November 2019. He released his second album, The Dress Circle, on November 19, 2021.

Discography 
 Bigger Things (2017)
 Gimme a Minute (2019)
 Worth the Wait (2019)
 Attachment Theory (2019)
 The Dress Circle (2021)

References 

1992 births
Living people
Place of birth missing (living people)
Australian record producers
Australian male rappers
Australian male songwriters